Benjamin A. Vig is an American politician from North Dakota. He is a former member of the North Dakota House of Representatives and the Democratic Party nominee for lieutenant governor in the 2020 election.

Vig graduated from Valley City State University in 2005. He defeated Bill Devlin in the 2006 elections to represent District 23 in the North Dakota House of Representatives. He lost his reelection bid to Devlin in 2010. Vig considered running for  seat in the United States House of Representatives in the 2012 election, but opted against it. He ran for the North Dakota House in District 23 again in 2014, but lost.

In the 2020 elections, Shelley Lenz, the Democratic nominee for governor of North Dakota, selected Vig as her running mate. Lenz and Vig lost to Doug Burgum and Brent Sanford, who were reelected to their second terms as governor and lieutenant governor, respectively.

References

External links

Living people
Democratic Party members of the North Dakota House of Representatives
People from Steele County, North Dakota
Valley City State University alumni
21st-century American politicians
Year of birth missing (living people)